Petersfield railway station serves the market town of Petersfield, Hampshire, England. It is on the Portsmouth Direct line,  down the line from  via Woking.

The station
The station has two tracks, and two platforms, although in the past had a third platform branching into the coal yard situated adjacent to the station and a fourth platform on the north side of the level crossing serving the branch to Midhurst closed in 1955. The main buildings date back to the opening of the line in 1859 and are of a "town" type, larger than other wayside stations on the route but identical to Godalming. The signal box, situated by the level crossing at the north-east end of the station, is an LSWR Type 3a box and a Grade II listed building.

There used to be a halt between Petersfield and Rowlands Castle, to the south of Buriton Tunnel, called Woodcroft. It was built to serve the local naval establishment. Because of its naval nature it was not featured on many maps, some maps however did mark it by a little tab but without a name.

Services 
All services at Petersfield are operated by South Western Railway using  and  EMUs.

The typical off-peak service in trains per hour is:
 3 tph to  via  (2 semi-fast, 1 stopping)

Gallery

References

External links 

Petersfield
Railway stations in Hampshire
DfT Category C2 stations
Former London and South Western Railway stations
Railway stations in Great Britain opened in 1859
Railway stations served by South Western Railway